Anna-Joséphine Dufour-Onofrio (1817-1901), was a French-Swiss businessperson.

She was the owner of the major Etamine manufacture company Dufour & Cie from 1842, and developed it to an internationally important company.

She founded the Thal Hospital.

The Dufour & Cie was united with Thal et Zurich in 1907 and became the Sefar in 1995.

References

1817 births
1901 deaths
19th-century Swiss businesswomen
19th-century Swiss businesspeople